The 1980 Crispa Redmanizers season was the sixth season of the franchise in the Philippine Basketball Association (PBA). The team was known as Walk Tall Jeans in the first two conferences.

Colors
Walk Tall Jeans (Open Conference)    (dark)    (light)Walk Tall Jeans (Open and Invitational Conferences)    Crispa Redmanizers (All-Filipino Conference)    (dark)    (light)

Summary
Crispa Walk Tall Jeans had the pair of Glenn Mosley and Sylvester Cuyler as their imports for the Open Conference. After five games, Mosley was replaced by Larry Boston. Two-time PBA Most Valuable Player William "Bogs" Adornado was released by Crispa to U/tex Wranglers after playing only seven games for the Jeans Makers. The team finish third behind Toyota and Great Taste after 18 games in the elimination phase. In the four-team semifinal round, the Jeans Makers swept the first round with three straight victories but lost their next two games before routing Great Taste in the last playing date on July 20 to create a triple-tie for the two finals berth. The U/Tex Wranglers secured the first finals seat, leaving Toyota and Walk Tall to dispute the other berth via playoff. The Jeans Makers lost to Toyota Tamaraws, 100-102, in the do-or-die game on July 22.

Byron "Snake" Jones, who previously played for Toyota and U/Tex and was Honda's import in the Open Conference, was acquired by Walk Tall for the Invitational championship to team up with Sylvester Cuyler. Walk Tall Jeans were denied of a finals seat for the second time by their arch rivals Toyota Tamaraws and place fourth after being swept in two games by the visiting Adidas/France in their series for third place.

19-game win streak & 8th PBA title
Two players namely Bernardo Carpio and Frank Natividad from Crispa's farm team in the MICAA were elevated to the pros as the ballclub return to Crispa Redmanizers in the All-Filipino Third Conference. They capped the season-ending conference with an incredible 19-game winning streak, sweeping their games in the eliminations, round of six, semifinals and the first two games of the finals.  The Redmanizers failed to sweep the whole conference when they lost Game three of the finals series against Toyota that snapped their winning run. Two nights later in Game four on December 13, the Redmanizers didn't allow the Tamaraws to gain momentum as they raced to a 24-point lead in the second quarter and coasted to a 105-91 victory and a 3-1 series win for their 8th league championship.

Notable dates
November 18: Philip Cezar scored 29 points and becomes the fifth player to hit 5,000 point career mark as Crispa beats Tanduay, 151-113. 

December 2: Freddie Hubalde scored a personal-high 45 points while Atoy Co added 32 points as the Redmanizers clinch the first finals seat in the All-Filipino Conference, routing Toyota Tamaraws, 143-114. Crispa remained unbeaten in the conference, winning their 16th straight game.

Award
Philip Cezar was voted as the season's Most Valuable Player (MVP).

Won-loss record vs Opponents

Roster

Subtraction

References

External links
 After 30 years, Crispa's win streak still unmatched@GMA News Online

1980
Crispa